Klaus Salzmann is an Austrian para-alpine skier and wheelchair tennis player. He won the gold medal in the Men's Giant Slalom LW11 event in alpine skiing at the 1998 Winter Paralympics. He also represented Austria at the 1994 Winter Paralympics and at the 2006 Winter Paralympics. He also competed in wheelchair tennis at the 1996 Summer Paralympics.

See also 
 List of Paralympic medalists in alpine skiing

References 

Living people
Year of birth missing (living people)
Place of birth missing (living people)
Paralympic alpine skiers of Austria
Alpine skiers at the 1994 Winter Paralympics
Alpine skiers at the 1998 Winter Paralympics
Alpine skiers at the 2006 Winter Paralympics
Wheelchair tennis players at the 1996 Summer Paralympics
Medalists at the 1998 Winter Paralympics
Paralympic gold medalists for Austria
Paralympic medalists in alpine skiing
20th-century Austrian people